= Hubert Clérissi =

Hubert Clérissi (1923–2023) was a Monegasque painter. He was the subject of an exhibition at Exhibition Hall on Quai Antoine Ier in February–March 2025. He is also the namesake of a street, rue Hubert Clérissi, in Monaco.
